Taulov is a town located in Fredericia Municipality in the eastern part of the Jutland peninsula in Denmark.  The town is, with a population of 3,402 (1 January 2022), the second largest in the municipality. 

Taulov's history is not that well known and it was nothing more than a village until the first railroads in Jutland were built in the 1860s during the industrial revolution. It is now divided into Gammel Taulov (Old Taulov) and Taulov by the motorway, despite Taulov Kirke being located in Taulov. Old Taulov grew up around the train station and the new main street while the majority of Taulov is squeezed in between the E20 motorway and Kolding Landevej, the old main road between Kolding and Snoghøj, which was the main way to access Eastern Denmark for many centuries.

Taulov Church is a medieval church in traditional Danish style, and was constructed in the 13th century. It functioned as a seamark for sailors on Kolding Fjord and Little Belt until modern navigation was introduced.

History
The name Taulov has existed for many hundreds of years, probably because of the word "tavle" as in Tavle Mark; this led to the name of Tavlov Nebel (Nebel meaning a place high above its surroundings) which eventually became Taulov.

Taulov has had settlements for the last 2,500 years, many of those resurfacing in these years of growth where fields are being turned into dwellings. The Church is from the 13th century and is placed on Tavlhøj, one of the highest points in the area, right on the edge of Elbodalen.

Taulov Parish is significant because of its proximity to the historically important city of Kolding. The parish had a castle designed to protect Kolding Fjord close to the church. The castle Høneborg is today nothing more than a small hill used for livestock. This castle has had a huge influence on Taulov Church, and the two royal sisters who were residents of the castle are buried in the apse of the church. The circular apse is in local history said to be the only one of its kind north of the Alps.

As Fredericia was completed only  from Taulov in the 1650s, the king wanted to make sure the new town was successful. Several villages closer to Fredericia were demolished and moved into the new fortified city, which left few villages in this area. As the stone churches were destroyed to reuse the stones to the fortifications and the new churches in Fredericia, it has also left only a few medieval churches in the area. Taulov and Taulov Church is therefore some of the few medieval villages and churches in the area to survive.

Taulov was a village for centuries, but when the railroad between Kolding and Fredericia was built in the 1860s, Taulov started to grow around and along the railroad. Over the next hundred years, Taulov grew to the size of a town. The railroad allowed for industry and retail to grow in the area and the community eventually became a municipality in its own right, known as Taulov Kommune. It was run from Tavlhøj near the church and school. During this time, Taulov Bygade boasted several shops and the only co-operative supermarket, Brugsen, in the area.

It wasn't until the 1970s and the building of the Danish motorways that Taulov started to really develop. In the 1970s, the Danish municipalities were being reformed and Taulov Kommune became a part of Fredericia Kommune. Tavlhøj was later turned into an activity center for retired people. Since the 1990s, more and more shops have closed down or relocated to Fredericia or Kolding, leaving only few shops in the town.

Just south of Taulov at Kolding Fjord, another town grew up around a small harbour, Skærbæk. This town is the nearest town to Taulov and works as the harbour of Taulov, both recreational and commercial. These two towns have always had a close relationship with shared schools, sportscenter, church and various cultural functions and clubs. The area is often referred to as "Taulov-Skærbæk". Skærbæks power plant Skærbæk Værket which is among the most important in the country has been a mayor workplace for people in both towns but has been rationalised, though the nearby headquarters of DONG Energy is still a mayor employer for people in Taulov.

Industry
Due to the very central location in Denmark with both a railroad and a motorway, and the large Fredericia Harbour nearby, Taulov grew into a national cargo hub in the 1980s and 1990s. Today, Taulov boasts of the local firm Veksø, one of Denmark's largest producers of street furniture and fixtures as well as several international cargo firms, among them the largest cargo center in Scandinavia. Furthermore, the city has the largest cheese factory in Europe as well as two smaller cheese factories producing, among other things, Castello cheeses, exporting mostly products for Arla Foods. Taulov is one of the most important industrial and cargo areas in the combined network between seven municipalities known as Trekantsområdet.

Locations

Taulov doesn't contain many attractions, although it has some well known locations on a regional scale.

"Den dybe betydnings sted" is a Buddhist center placed in Taulov as part of the Karma Kadjy School. It is growing rapidly according to the center itself, and is considering expanding.

"Kryb-i-ly Kro" is a very popular and somewhat famous Kro (inn) on the edge of Taulov. The story goes that on a cold and windy night, the Danish king was heading from Kolding to Snoghøj to cross Little Belt as he decided to find some place to hide from the weather. As he saw a small farm, he allegedly said "kryb i ly"("seek shelter"), thereby naming the farm and the inn that was later built right next to it. The original inn was consumed by flames, but it was rebuilt and still sits on an impressive view over Kolding Fjord.

Taulov has been a popular site for settlements in the Iron Age and Bronze Age, and the area contains several tombs and findings of old settlements. One of the recent findings was found when the second motorway in the area was being built just north of the town. The tomb now sits at a gas station further north along the new E45 motorway and is one of the largest found in Jutland.

Elbohallen is the local sports center originally built on a field between the two towns, but now lies within the boundaries of Taulov. Other than being the home to most of the local sports teams, it has a community/party hall, a cafeteria, a youth centre and is used for balls, fairs and markets. It is also one of the preferred centers for disability sport events on a regional level.

Several times during the last couple of decades, Taulov has been connected with prestigious projects which could have given the town a boost. Some of the projects included a new International Standard stadium and an IKEA store, as well as a large indoor skiing ramp and vacation centres.

The latest discussions are concerning a large regional hospital replacing the hospitals in Kolding, Vejle and Fredericia.

Culture
Taulov has a population of 3,402 as of 1 January 2022, and the population growth has been slow for many years. But in recent years, the town has been growing, as Trekantsområdet has been growing in importance and size.

Sports clubs have had a few years of success in the combined club between Taulov and the neighbouring town Skærbæk at the Little Belt, Taulov-Skæbæk IF. But in recent years, the club has lost its best players who instead have moved to Kolding and Fredericia who have teams in the best leagues. Almost all sports clubs in the two towns are based in Elbohallen with a few clubs based on schools.

Taulov currently shares a monthly newsletter/paper with Skærbæk called Tau-bæk Nyt. It is a non-profit organisation dependent on volunteer writers and uses income from ads for printing and distribution. It is used by local clubs and organisations to share news and keep people up to date.

Notable people 
 Stine Knudsen (born 1992 in Taulov) a Danish handball player who currently plays for København Håndbold.

References

Cities and towns in the Region of Southern Denmark
Fredericia Municipality